Fullbrook is a surname. Notable people with the surname include:

Lorraine Fullbrook (born 1959), British politician
Mark Fullbrook (born 1962), British political strategist, lobbyist and Downing Street Chief of Staff
Sam Fullbrook (1922–2004), Australian artist
Charles Fullbrook-Leggatt (né Fullbrook), British soldier who served in both world wars

See also
Fullbrook School, school in Surrey, England
Fulbrook (disambiguation)

Surnames of British Isles origin